Dean Spaulding Potter (April 14, 1972 – May 16, 2015) was an American free climber, alpinist, BASE jumper, and highliner. He completed many hard first ascents, free solo ascents, speed ascents, and enchainments in Yosemite National Park and Patagonia. In 2015, he died in a wingsuit flying accident in Yosemite National Park.

Early life
Dean Potter was born in 1972 to an Army officer in a military hospital at Fort Leavenworth, Kansas and grew up in New Hampshire. He taught himself to climb when he was in 10th grade in southern New Hampshire. He attended the University of New Hampshire, where he rowed varsity crew. Potter quit college and pursued his passion for climbing.

Climbing career

Free solo
Potter climbed many new routes and completed many solo ascents in Yosemite and Patagonia. He free-solo climbed a small part of El Capitan in Yosemite, where he pioneered a route he called Easy Rider by climbing down the slabby upper pitches of the route Lurking Fear (hardest moves rated grade 5.10a) and then traversed Thanksgiving Ledge to complete the last six pitches and six hundred feet of the route Free Rider (hardest pitch 5.11d, two pitches of 5.10d, 5.10b, 5.10a and 5.7).  This was the first major section of El Capitan to be free soloed, but his path avoided the significantly more challenging climbing on what is the easiest way up El Capitan below (several 5.12 pitches, with difficulty up to 5.12d on Free Rider).

Big wall
In July 2006, Potter climbed The Reticent Wall, one of the hardest routes on El Capitan in Yosemite Valley, in 34 hours and 57 minutes with Ammon McNeely and Ivo Ninov, slashing five days off the existing time. Potter and Sean Leary set a new speed record for climbing up The Nose of El Capitan in November 2010. They ran up the 31-pitch route in 2 hours, 36 minutes, 45 seconds. This was twenty seconds quicker than the existing record, set the previous October by Yuji Hirayama and Hans Florine.  Potter's record was later surpassed by Brad Gobright and Jim Reynolds followed by Alex Honnold and Tommy Caldwell, who completed The Nose route in 1 hour 58 minutes in June 2018.

Delicate Arch climb
Controversy surrounded Potter after his 2006 climb of Delicate Arch in Arches National Park, for which he lost his sponsorship from the Patagonia clothing company. "There wasn't any legal reason for me not to climb it," Potter said of Delicate Arch, despite well-established tradition forbidding climbing named features in the park. This incident resulted in a blanket ban on the activity within Arches National Park. Potter had previously created conflict with Park authorities by slacklining between the Three Gossips.

"I didn't see any moral reason not to climb it. I didn't hurt it," he said, though rope grooves in the soft sandstone were later found, possibly created or enhanced by the professional photographers Potter brought along to publicize the climb.

Potter said he would not climb Totem Pole, the spire in Monument Valley that Navajo imbue with religious significance. Delicate Arch, despite its prominence on Utah license plates, did not have the stature of the sacred Arizona tower, he said: "I didn't see a reason why it's wrong, why we shouldn't mesh with nature." An account said: "At first Potter's handler at Patagonia spread the word of his climb by calling the Salt Lake Tribune. Public outrage was immediate, though, especially in Utah, where many see Delicate Arch as a symbol for the state's wild beauty."
	
Potter's Delicate Arch climb was memorialized in hip hop artist Chris "Odub" Hampton's song "Not All Roses," which chronicles the controversy surrounding the climb. Odub's later "Cease and Desist" responds to the cease-and-desist order that Potter's attorney sent the artist in response to "Not All Roses."

Highlining, BASE jumping, and FreeBASEing

Potter was also known for highlining and BASE jumping. He was introduced to slacklining by Charles Victor Tucker III, known as "Chongo", one of the first three people to highline across Lost Arrow Spire. Potter completed a variety of highline-crossings without the benefit of a safety lanyard, backup line, or BASE jumping parachute.

On August 6, 2008, he completed the first "FreeBASE" ascent of Deep Blue Sea on the north face of the Eiger. Potter invented freebasing, a combination of free solo climbing without the assistance of ropes—but with a BASE parachute rig attached on the climber's back. In the event of a fall, a climber can revert into a base jump and survive.

In 2014, he released a 22-minute-long film, When Dogs Fly, that chronicled the extreme adventures of his hearing dog, Whisper. The film became a viral phenomenon, but was criticised by animal rights activists.

Death
On May 16, 2015, Potter and Graham Hunt died attempting a proximity wingsuit flight  from Taft Point above Yosemite Valley.  The route they were attempting, which they had flown before, required them to clear a small notch in a rocky ridge line. Hunt hit a side wall during the flight while Potter cleared the notch before crashing. Both died on impact. Neither of them had deployed their parachutes. Potter's and Graham's deaths brought the total number of BASE jumping death in U.S. national parks in 2015 to five.

Notable ascents

2002 Supercanaleta, Cerro Fitz Roy, Patagonia. First solo of route.
2003 Concepcion 5.13+ (67m), Day Canyon, Moab, Utah. First ascent.
2006 Heaven (5.12d/13a) Glacier Point, Yosemite Valley. First free solo ascent.
2006 Southern Belle (V 5.12d R/X), Half Dome, Yosemite Valley.  Second ascent with Leo Houlding.
2008 Deep Blue Sea (5.12+), Eiger, Bernese Alps, Switzerland. First FreeBASE ascent of the Eiger.
2010 The Nose, El Capitan, Yosemite. Fastest ascent at the time (2:36:45), record later broken by Alex Honnold and Hans Florine.

See also 
History of rock climbing
List of first ascents (sport climbing)
 Alex Honnold

References

External links
Dean's Online Memorial
Outside Magazine feature
Dean Potter's climbing profile on Climbandmore.com
The New York Times article
Video interview about Potter's childhood dreams of flying, wingsuit piloting and BASE jumping
"Dean Potter's Extreme Life in 7 Hair-Raising Videos"

1972 births
2015 deaths
Accidental deaths in California
American rock climbers
BASE jumping deaths
Deaths in Yosemite National Park
Free soloists
Tightrope walkers
People from Fort Leavenworth, Kansas
Sportspeople from Kansas
Sportspeople from New Hampshire
University of New Hampshire alumni
Wingsuit flight deaths
Laureus World Sports Awards winners